Catalina Anais Soto Campos (born 8 April 2001) is a Chilean professional racing cyclist, who currently rides for UCI Women's Continental Team . She rode in the women's time trial event at the 2020 UCI Road World Championships. In June 2021, she qualified to represent Chile at the 2020 Summer Olympics.

References

External links
 

2001 births
Living people
Chilean female cyclists
Place of birth missing (living people)
Olympic cyclists of Chile
Cyclists at the 2020 Summer Olympics
21st-century Chilean women
Sportspeople from Santiago